Terrence N. Ingram is an American author and activist, who lives in Apple River, Illinois.

He is best known for his books on the bald eagle, the Eagle Nature Foundation, and his work in rebuilding the bald eagle population to remove it from the threatened species lists.

He has also been active as a bee keeper, apiary instructor and bee researcher, as well as a columnist with the American Bee Journal.

Education
Ingram is primarily a farmer with degrees in math and physics and one of his minors is biology.

Eagles

In 1995, Ingram founded the Eagle Nature Foundation. He and the foundation are credited as a large influence in removing the bald eagle from the American endangered species list.

His book, Eagle, was published by Metro Books in 1998. He has also published numerous articles on the recovery of the bald eagle population.

Bees

Ingram did research on the effects of Monsanto's herbicide, Roundup, as a proposed cause of colony collapse disorder in honey bees.

In March 2012, his bees were seized by the Illinois Department of Agriculture, with a claim that they were infected by American foulbrood.  The hives were destroyed prior to the hearing, and therefore he could not present evidence of infection, or lack of infection of his hives.  He has asserted that his 15 years of research regarding the effects of a herbicide on bees was the cause of the seizure.

References

External links
American Bee Journal
Eagle Nature Foundation

American naturalists
Living people
Year of birth missing (living people)